"What Is Love" was the final single from En Vogue's second album, Funky Divas. The song was not released commercially, but was instead shipped to dance clubs across the United States. "What Is Love" reached the Top 10 of the US dance charts. The song appeared again in 1993 as part of the group's Runaway Love EP. This was the only song En Vogue produced for market featuring Maxine Jones and Cindy Herron sharing lead vocals. It was initially to be included on Remix to Sing as a new song, but missed the production deadline and was added to Funky Divas.

Critical reception
Larry Flick from Billboard called the song "the only house-minded moment" on Funky Divas, adding that it "has been nicely retouched with a thick'n'chewy underground groove by Mentalinstrum, who is better known as a member of the Smack Productions posse. He has done a fine job of taking the song to interesting new depths, while wisely keeping those nifty vocals front and center at all times." Arion Berger from Entertainment Weekly said the album "has an awkward charm", especially on "What Is Love", "in which they archly recite dictionary definitions of the word." Pop Rescue noted that "parts of this song" reminds "a bit of Deee-Lite’s What Is Love?, pieces of Madonna‘s ‘Vogue’, Ce Ce Peniston and Kym Sims." They added that "the vocals really belt out here, and at times, it doesn’t sound very much like En Vogue amongst all the spoken word sections, and sampled bits." Cheo H. Coker from Stanford Daily described the song as "a house groove" with "a rather funky, upbeat note", and added that it "will also be a commercial success."

Charts

References

1993 singles
En Vogue songs
1992 songs
Songs written by Denzil Foster
Songs written by Thomas McElroy
East West Records singles